Nikolay Fyodorov may refer to:

Nikolai Fyodorovich Fyodorov (1829–1903), Russian Orthodox Christian philosopher and futurist
Nikolay Fyodorov (film director) (1914–1994), animator and film director
Nikolay Fyodorov (politician) (born 1958), 1st President of Chuvashia and Russian Federal Minister of Agriculture
Nikolay Ivanovich Fedorov (1918–1990), Russian painter and textile designer

See also
Nikolai Fyodorovich Vatutin, Soviet military commander